Israel competed at the 1976 Summer Olympics in Montreal, Quebec, Canada. 28 competitors, 26 men and 2 women, took part in 19 events in 10 sports.

Summary
Israel sent to the Olympics a football team, that qualified for the second time, and 11 individual athletes, the same number as the victims in Munich massacre four years earlier. All seven sports represented at the 1972 Olympics were retained for 1976: Athletics, swimming, shooting, fencing, wrestling, weight lifting and sailing. In addition to football, gymnastics also appeared for the second time, after a break of 16 years, and judo made its debut on the Israeli Olympic team.

This was by far the most successful Olympic Games for Israel until then. Esther Roth-Shahamorov, the only team member who was also in Munich, became the first Israeli athlete in any sport who reached an Olympic final, and finished sixth in women's 100m hurdles. Her place is still the best achievement by an Israeli track athlete.
In weightlifting, Eduard Weitz came in fifth place, the best achievement of an Israeli at the Olympics in any sport until then, which still remains the best achievement in weightlifting in Israel's Olympic history.
Another fine achievement was seventh place (unofficially) for Rami Miron in wrestling.
Those three results were better than any previous result of Israeli athlete at the Olympics.

The football team, despite drawing its three preliminary round matches, still advanced to the quarterfinals, where it was eliminated by Brazil. It was a repeat of Israel's achievement in 1968.

Athletics

Fencing

Football

During the 1976 Summer Olympics, Israel competed in football along with Iran and North Korea in the AFC. Additionally, Israeli referee Abraham Klein worked the tournament. Israel lost to Brazil in the quarter-finals and was eliminated.

Preliminary round - Group B

Standings

Matches

Quarterfinals

Bracket

Matches

Final ranking

Goal scorers
2 goals
 Vicky Peretz

1 goal
 Itzhak Shum
 Yaron Oz

Squad
Head coach: David Schweitzer

Gymnastics

Judo

Sailing

Shooting

Swimming

Weightlifting

Wrestling

References

External links
Official Olympic Reports

Nations at the 1976 Summer Olympics
1976 Summer Olympics
Summer Olympics